The 1936 Oklahoma A&M Cowboys football team represented Oklahoma A&M College in the 1936 college football season. This was the 36th year of football at A&M and the first under Ted Cox who formerly coached at Tulane. The Cowboys played their home games at Lewis Field in Stillwater, Oklahoma. They finished the season 1–9, 1–2 in the Missouri Valley Conference.

Schedule

References

Oklahoma AandM
Oklahoma State Cowboys football seasons
Oklahoma AM